Star Wars Rebellion (known as Star Wars Supremacy in the United Kingdom and Ireland) is a real-time strategy game released in 1998 by LucasArts and set in the fictional Star Wars expanded universe.

Reception

The game received poor reviews according to the review aggregation website GameRankings. Next Generation stated, "LucasArts should start looking more closely at what it slaps the Star Wars brand on, as consumers will be less likely to forget or forgive."

According to PC Data, the game was the U.S.' 18th-best-selling computer game during the January–November 1998 period.

The game won the award for "Most Disappointing Game of the Year" at GameSpots Best & Worst of 1998 Awards. It was also nominated for "The Underachiever Award" at IGNs Best of 1998 Awards, which ultimately went to Trespasser.

Macworld saw LucasArts' 2006 game Star Wars: Empire at War as a successor to Rebellion.

References

External links

1998 video games
4X video games
LucasArts games
Real-time strategy video games
Rebellion
Video games developed in the United States
Windows games
Windows-only games